The 1933–34 William & Mary Indians men's basketball team represented the College of William & Mary as a member of Virginia Conference during the 1933–34 NCAA men's basketball season. Led by fifth-year head coach John Kellison, the Indians compiled an overall record of 4–9 with a mark of 2–4 in conference play. This was the 29th season of the collegiate basketball program at William & Mary, whose nickname is now the Tribe.

Schedule

|-
!colspan=9 style="background:#006400; color:#FFD700;"| Regular season

Source

References

William and Mary
William & Mary Tribe men's basketball seasons
William and Mary Indians basketball, men's
William and Mary Indians basketball, men's